Assadullah Hamdam is an Afghan politician who was appointed as Governor of Oruzgan Province by President Hamid Karzai in September 2007, to replace Governor Maulavi Abdul Hakim Munib who had become ineffective.

References 

Governors of Urozgan Province
Year of birth missing (living people)
Living people
People from Zabul Province
Pashtun people